Wanda Wulz (Trieste, Austro-Hungarian Empire 25 July 1903 – Trieste, Italy, 16 April 1984) was an Italian experimental photographer. 

Wulz was born on 25 July 1903 in Trieste, Italy. Both her grandfather Giuseppe Wulz and her father Carlo Wulz were photographers who shot social events and created portraits of fellow artists and local intellectuals. Wanda began her career photographing musicians, dancers, and actors in Trieste. She exhibited six photographs in Rome in 1930. One example of her work is her self-portrait merged with a portrait of a cat.

Wanda often collaborated on work with her sister, Marion Wulz. Both Wanda and Marion would take over the photography studio of their father Carlo. Before creating her own work, Marion, who was also a painter under Pietro Lucano, served as a model for her father's photography. The sisters photographed celebrities such as dancers Nini Perno and Alba Wiegele, fencer Irene Camber, and were photographed together by fashion designer Anita Pittoni.

In 1932, she joined the Futurist movement after meeting Filippo Tommaso Marinetti in an art exhibition. Her photography in the late 1930s would frequently incorporate superposed images and motion. She eventually left Futurism at the end of the 1930s.

References

Further reading
Rosenblum, Naomi. A History of Women Photographers. New York: Abbeville, 1994.

1903 births
1984 deaths
Italian women photographers
Artists from Trieste
20th-century Italian photographers
20th-century women photographers
20th-century Italian women artists